Bidayat al Hidayah was written by Abū Ḥāmid Muḥammad ibn Muḥammad al-Ghazālī during his last days. It is a guidebook describing the principles of getting guidance through taqwa. The manual is concise and arranged in the form of a daily programme. The book contains three sections, which are on the obedience, refraining from disobedience, and the etiquette of companionship with the God and His creation. It serves as a preface to his major texts.

References 

Books by Al-Ghazali
Books about Islam
12th-century books
Persian literature
Sufi literature